The N12 is a national route in South Africa which runs from George through Beaufort West, Kimberley, Klerksdorp and Johannesburg to eMalahleni.

It is the only other National Route after the N1 Route that connects the Western Cape Province with the Gauteng Province. Prior to 1971, the N12 from Johannesburg to Three Sisters was known as the N13.

Route

Summary

The road starts in George in the Western Cape and ends in eMalahleni in Mpumalanga. The road runs roughly from south to north, however, once it passes Kimberley in the Northern Cape, it gradually turns eastward. Only the section between Soweto and eMalahleni is a limited access dual motorway. The section between Klerksdorp and Potchefstroom is a dual carriage highway.
The N12 remains the only National Route other than the N1 that links Beaufort West with Johannesburg. Apart from the Greater Johannesburg Area Section between Soweto and Daveyton, where the Gauteng e-toll system has been installed, the N12 is toll-free for its entire route.

Western Cape

The N12 Route begins south-east of the town centre of George at an intersection with the N2. From this junction, it runs concurrently with the N9. It goes north-west, through the centre of George. Near Mont Fleur Mountain Estate, the N12/N9 turns northwards, passing through the western area of the Witfontein Nature Reserve as the Outeniqua Pass.

At the junction with the R62 at the northern edge of the Outeniqua Mountains, the N12 splits from the N9 and becomes cosigned with the R62, going north-west towards Oudtshoorn (33 km). In Oudtshoorn, at the four-way intersection with the R328, the R62 continues by way of a left turn and the N12 continues by way of a right turn at the same junction. The N12 goes east-north-east for 35 km up to De Rust, where it meets the R341 Route. At this point, it turns northwards, becoming the Meiringspoort Pass, passing the Swartberg mountain range. After Meiringspoort, at Klaarstroom, the N12 cosigns with the R407 for a few kilometres westwards up to the next junction, where the R407 continues west and the N12 continues north. The N12 makes a 120 km journey to Beaufort West.

Just before Beaufort West, at the south-eastern edge of the Karoo National Park, the N12 meets the N1 National Route and joins it. They are one route through Beaufort West, meeting the western terminus of the R61. The N1 and N12 routes remain as one road for the next 75 km north-east from Beaufort West to Three Sisters, where they enter the Northern Cape.

Northern Cape

At Three Sisters by the Shell Ultra City, the N12/N1 enter the Northern Cape. At the next junction, the N12 and the N1 split, with the N1 continuing to Colesberg and the N12 becoming the road northwards. The N12 and the N1 meet again later, in Johannesburg South, Gauteng. The N12 is the only National Route other than the N1 that links the Western Cape with Johannesburg, with the N12 passing through Kimberley and the N1 passing through Bloemfontein. While the N1 is a toll road from Bloemfontein onwards, the N12 is toll-free to Johannesburg South.

From the Three Sisters split, the N12 makes a 170 km journey, through Victoria West (where it meets the R63), to Britstown, where it meets the N10 National Route coming from De Aar. The two routes cosign for 3 km northwards before the N10 makes its own way towards Upington and Namibia.

The N12 continues north-east for 254 km, through Strydenburg and Hopetown (where it crosses the Orange River), to Kimberley (capital city of the Northern Cape). It enters as Memorial Road, meeting the south-eastern terminus of the R31 Road before meeting the N8 National Route (which is coming from Bloemfontein) and co-signing with it northwards as Bultfontein Road. At the Long Street junction, the N8 becomes Long Street westwards and the N12 becomes the road eastwards. Just after, the N12 meets the western terminus of the R64 Road (which is also coming from Bloemfontein) and becomes the road northwards (Quinn Street).

From Hopetown, the N12 National Route gradually follows the shape of the border between the Northern Cape and the Free State, as well as the border between the North West and the Free State. (Following in close proximity, slow switching from going northwards to going eastwards without touching the border)

From Kimberley, the N12 makes a 75 km journey northwards to Warrenton, where it meets the N18 National Route and crosses the Vaal River.

North West

Just after Warrenton, the N12 enters the North West. It makes a 100 km Journey north-east, following the Vaal River, through Christiana, to Bloemhof, where it meets the R34 Road (co-signed for 2 kilometres) and passes through as Prince Street.

From Bloemhof, the N12 continues north-east for 150 km, passed Wolmaransstad, to Klerksdorp, where it becomes a freeway (dual carriageway highway) and meets the R30 Road. It continues eastwards as a freeway for another 50 km to Potchefstroom, an academic city (where it meets the R53 Route in the city centre next to the Mooi River crossing and the western terminus of the R54 Route about 9 kilometres after the city centre).

Gauteng

After Potchefstroom, the N12 enters Gauteng eastwards and bypasses the towns of Carletonville (in the Merafong City Local Municipality), Westonaria (in the Rand West City Local Municipality; where it meets the R28 Road) and Lenasia as the Moroka Bypass into the City of Johannesburg Metropolitan Municipality. At the R558 junction, the N12 becomes a freeway. Just after being the road separating Soweto and Lenasia, the N12 meets the N1 National Route again (north eastbound only) at the Misgund Interchange.

The N12 joins the N1 and they become one freeway northwards for four kilometres up to the Diepkloof Interchange, the south-western corner of the Johannesburg Ring Road. The R553 Road off-ramp just before the Diepkloof Interchange marks the beginning of the N12 being a toll road (an e-toll Highway; with open road tolling).

As the N1 continues north through the western area of Johannesburg's municipality as the N1 Western Bypass, the N12 becomes the highway going eastwards through the southern area of Johannesburg as the N12 Southern Bypass. Here, the N12 Southern Bypass, which cuts a concrete swath through the rocky hills of southern Johannesburg, is apparently very reminiscent of the freeways of Los Angeles, and together with Johannesburg's sunshine, renders a real Southern California feel to that part of the city.

Just after splitting from the N1, north of Southgate Mall and south of the Aeroton industrial area, at the Uncle Charlie's Interchange, the N12 meets the M1 Freeway (north eastbound only), which is the freeway to Johannesburg Central and Sandton. The N12 highway continues eastwards, through many suburbs of Johannesburg South (like Ridgeway, Winchester Hills and Oakdene), to Alberton. At the Reading interchange with the R59 Sybrand van Niekerk Freeway in Alberton, the N12 begins to change direction, slowly turning northwards. The next off-ramp with the M31/R103 provides access to Alberton Central.

At the Elands Interchange, the N12 merges with the N3 Freeway from Heidelberg and Durban to form the N3 Eastern Bypass portion of the Johannesburg Ring Road, going northwards. At the Elands Interchange, as part of the Gauteng Freeway Improvement Scheme, two slip roads have been made linking the N17 Freeway to the N12 Freeway. It is now possible to travel from the N17 West to the N12 West and from the N12 East to the N17 East (previously only possible via the N3).

While cosigned with the N3 northwards, they are one road, bypassing Germiston (Capital of Ekurhuleni) to the west and intersecting with the M2 Freeway at the Geldenhuys Interchange, where the M2 provides access to Germiston Central in the east and Johannesburg Central in the west.

The N3/N12 continue northwards up to the George Bizos Interchange (previously known as the Gillooly's Interchange) in Bedfordview, east of the Eastgate Shopping Centre. At this interchange, the N12 leaves the Eastern Bypass portion of the Johannesburg Ring Road (which remains designated as the N3 up to Johannesburg North) and joins the R24 Airport Freeway eastwards. Due to common traffic at this interchange, it is purported to be the busiest interchange in the Southern Hemisphere.

The N12 is cosigned with the R24 for 2 kilometers. Just before the Edenvale Road off-ramp, the R24 and the N12 split, with the R24 becoming its own east-north-east freeway towards O. R. Tambo International Airport (Johannesburg International Airport) and the N12 continuing eastwards on its present highway towards Benoni and Witbank.

The N12 continues through the City of Ekurhuleni Metropolitan Municipality, bypassing Germiston and Boksburg to the north. North of Boksburg, the N12 meets the R21 Toll Freeway from Pretoria and Johannesburg International Airport in the north (providing access to Boksburg Central in the south). It continues east as the road separating Benoni Central from Benoni's northern suburbs (where it meets the R23 north of the town centre).

It continues eastwards, bypassing Daveyton and Etwatwa, to leave the City of Ekurhuleni Metropolitan Municipality and enter the Mpumalanga Province. At the R51 Road exit in Daveyton (north of Springs), the N12 stops being an toll road (the N12 stops being an e-toll highway).

Mpumalanga

In Mpumalanga, the N12 continues as a dual carriageway freeway and the first town it bypasses is the town of Delmas. From the R50 Delmas exit, The N12 goes for another 60 km east, meeting the R42 and bypassing Ogies, to eMalahleni (Witbank).

The N12 National Route marks its end at the point where it merges with the N4 Highway East (Maputo Corridor) (Pretoria-Maputo Highway) in Witbank East, just before the city of Middelburg.

Trans-African Highway Network

The N18 Road from the Botswana Border, passing through Mahikeng and Vryburg of the North West Province to Warrenton, together with the N12 to Beaufort West and the N1 Road to Cape Town in the Western Cape are collectively declared part of the Trans African Highway no. 4 Extension (Cairo-Cape Town Highway) (Great North Road). The N12 between Three Sisters and Warrenton is very important as it is part of the Trans-African Highway Network number 4 Extension between Gaborone and Cape Town.

Meiringspoort Pass

The Meiringspoort section in the Swartberg between De Rust and Klaarstroom follows the gorge cut by the Groot River. It is a scenic drive crossing twelve old drifts (replaced by bridges today). From De Rust one will cross the drifts in the following order: Spook drift, Boesman drift, Nooiensboom drift, Dubble Drif se Draai, Ou tol drift, Wa drift, Witfontein se drift, Ontploffings drift, Perskeboom drift, Wasgat drift, Eerste/Laaste drift.

Monuments
 Herrie's Stone, Meiringspoort. The writer C.J. Langenhoven chiselled the name of the elephant Herrie from his book Sonde met die Bure, on this rock in July 1929.

References

External links

 National Roads Agency SA

National Roads in South Africa
Highways in South Africa
Karoo
Toll roads in South Africa
Streets and roads of Johannesburg
Roads in South Africa